Muslimist may refer to:

Muslim, an adherent of Islam
Islamist, an adherent of Islamism

See also
Muslimism (disambiguation)
Muslim (disambiguation)
Islamicist (disambiguation)